{{Speciesbox
|name = Illawarra socketwood
|image = Ilawarra Socketwood - leaves on stalk.jpg
|image_caption = Illawarra socketwood, leaves from a fallen branch
|status = EN
|status_system = EPBC
|genus = Daphnandra
|species = johnsonii
|authority = Schodde
|synonyms = {{smalldiv|
 Daphnandra micrantha (Tul.) Benth. sens. lat.
 Daphnandra species C.
 Daphnandra sp. C sensu Harden (1990) novo-hollandicum Daphnandra sp. C Illawarra Schodde 3475}}
}}Daphnandra johnsonii, also known as the Illawarra socketwood, is a rare rainforest tree in the Illawarra district of eastern Australia.

Habitat

It is found most often at less than 150 metres above sea level on volcanic soils in sub tropical rainforest. Occasionally it is found as high as 350 metres above sea level. It grows often by creeks, or dry rocky scree slopes, and in disturbed forest and rainforest margins. It is distributed from southern Berry, New South Wales to Scarborough, New South Wales in the northern Illawarra (34° S).

Naming and taxonomy
A member of the ancient Gondwana family Atherospermataceae, the Illawarra socketwood is endangered by extinction. Formerly considered the southernmost population of Daphnandra micrantha, the Australian socketwood. Recently it has been recognised as a separate species. The type specimen collected in the Illawarra district by L.A.S. Johnson, after whom the species was named, by Richard Schodde. The generic name Daphnandra refers to a similarity of the anthers of the bay laurel. Greek daphne refers to the bay laurel, and andros from the Greek for man. The term "socketwood" is from the related species Daphnandra apatela. A feature of which is where larger branchlets meet the main trunk. This joining resembles a "ball and socket" type joint.

Description

A small to medium-sized tree. Growing to around 20 metres tall and a stem diameter of 30 cm, with a broad and shady crown. The trunk is beige in colour, cylindrical with little buttressing. Sometimes seen with coppice leaves at the base. The bark is fairly smooth with some raised pustules of a darker colour. Branchlets are fairly thick with lenticels. Wider and flatter at the nodes. Leaf scars evident. Leaf buds with soft hairs.

Leaves

Leaves ovate or elliptic in shape, 6 to 12 cm long, 1.5 cm to 6 cm wide with a sharply angled tip. Leaves are opposite on the stem, prominently toothed, 7 to 9 teeth on each side of the leaf. The bottom third of the leaf is without leaf serrations. The point of the leaf base to the first serration is almost a straight line. The bottom of the leaf is glossy pale green, the top side is a dull dark green.

Leaf venation is more evident under the leaf. Lateral veins not clear on the top surface. Mid rib raised both sides of the leaf. Six or seven pairs of lateral veins. Leaf stems 2 to 7 mm long, and smooth. Old leaves go pale and turn yellow on the stem.

Leaf comparison with common sassafras

Leaves similar to the related common sassafras (Doryphora sassafras''). There are one or two teeth per centimetre on the Illawarra socketwood. The mid rib is raised above and below on the Illawarra socketwood. Lateral veins of the common sassafras are at a less acute angle than the Illawarra socketwood. Illawarra socketwood lateral veins are sharply angled at around 40 degrees in relation to the mid rib of the leaf.

The scent of the leaf is more faint and "soapy" on the Illawarra socketwood. Leaves of common sassafras are more aromatic, usually less coarsely toothed and the mid rib is sunken on the upper surface. Common Sassafras leaves thicker and heavier to touch.

Flowers & fruit

Tiny flowers appear in spring, on long flower stems. Flowers white with pinkish red margins. They form on panicles or racemes, 3 to 8 cm long. The sepals and petals are around 1 to 3 mm. The fruiting capsule is woody and hairless, around 15 to 20 mm long. Opening in two sections. Mature seeds are feathery.

Regeneration

Healthy seeds germinate readily within a month of sowing.

Plants often don't produce fertile fruit in the wild and these fruit are shorter and rounder than the viable fruit. These short fruit appear to be galled and contain no seed but contain many silky hairs or plumes that are normally attached to the seeds. Some trees contain a mixture of both short, galled fruits and long fertile fruits, most trees seem to only produce galled fruits and trees that produce only fertile fruits are rare.

It also has a limited ability to colonize new areas. Its main survival strategy is the ability to sucker and coppice.

Conservation & threats

Most of the 41 sites are under immediate threat from clearing for agriculture, urban expansion, feral animals, weeds, inappropriate use of fire and herbicide, quarrying, and road construction. Only two small populations are conserved in the reserve system. The biggest and healthiest populations are on private property.

References

 plantnet.rbgsyd.nsw.gov.au

External links
 rainforests.net.au
 environment.nsw.gov.au
 L.A.S. Johnson
 alkaloids
 threatenedspecies.environment.nsw.gov.au

Atherospermataceae
Trees of Australia
Endangered flora of Australia
Flora of New South Wales